Gary Michael Krist (born 1957) is an American writer of fiction, nonfiction, travel journalism, and literary criticism.  Before turning to narrative nonfiction with The White Cascade (2007), a book about the 1910 Wellington avalanche, City of Scoundrels (2012), about Chicago's tragic summer of 1919, and Empire of Sin (2014), about the reform wars in turn-of-the-century New Orleans, Krist wrote three novels--Bad Chemistry (1998), Chaos Theory (2000), and Extravagance (2002).  He has also written two short story collections--The Garden State (1988) and Bone by Bone (1994). His latest book is The Mirage Factory: Illusion, Imagination, and the Invention of Los Angeles (2018).

Career
He has been a frequent book reviewer for The New York Times Book Review, Salon, and The Washington Post Book World. His satire pieces have appeared in The New York Times, The Washington Post Outlook section, and Newsday, and his stories, articles, and travel pieces have been featured in National Geographic Traveler, The Wall Street Journal, GQ, Playboy, The New Republic, and Esquire, and on National Public Radio's Selected Shorts. His short stories have also been anthologized in such collections as Men Seeking Women, Writers' Harvest 2, and Best American Mystery Stories.

He has been the recipient of The Stephen Crane Award, the Sue Kaufman Prize from The American Academy of Arts and Letters, a Lowell Thomas Gold Medal for Travel Journalism, and a fellowship from the National Endowment for the Arts. "Empire of Sin" was named one of the top ten books of 2014 by The Washington Post and Library Journal. Krist has been awarded a 2020-2021 Public Scholar grant from the National Endowment for the Humanities to support the research for his next book, about the early history of San Francisco.

Life 
Born in Jersey City, New Jersey, Krist is a graduate of Princeton University.  In 1979–80, he studied literature at the Universitaet Konstanz (Germany) on a Fulbright Scholarship.  The author has been profiled in The New York Times Book Review (November 6, 1988) and the Style section of The Washington Post (February 25, 2007).

Krist and his wife live in Jersey City, New Jersey.

Bibliography
Novels and story collections
The Garden State New York : Vintage Books, 1988. , 
Bone by Bone New York Harcourt Brace, 1994. , 
Bad Chemistry New York: Random House, 1998. , 
Chaos Theory New York : Jove Books, 2001. , 
Extravagance New York : Broadway Books, 2002. , 

Nonfiction
The White Cascade: The Great Northern Railway Disaster and America's Deadliest Avalanche New York: Henry Holt and Company, 2007. , 
City of Scoundrels: The 12 Days of Disaster that Gave Birth to Modern Chicago New York: Broadway Books, 2012. , 
Empire of Sin: A Story of Sex, Jazz, Murder, and the Battle for Modern New Orleans New York: Broadway Books, 2014. 
The Mirage Factory: Illusion, Imagination, and the Invention of Los Angeles New York: Crown Publishers, 2018. ,

External links
 Gary Krist's website
 The White Cascade website
 Interview with Gary Krist about 'The White Cascade'
 NPR Interview with Gary Krist about 'City of Scoundrels'
  Dining With Strangers interview with Gary Krist about 'Empire of Sin'

1957 births
Living people
20th-century American novelists
21st-century American novelists
American male journalists
American literary critics
American male novelists
American travel writers
People from Bethesda, Maryland
Writers from Jersey City, New Jersey
Princeton University alumni
Novelists from Maryland
American male short story writers
20th-century American short story writers
21st-century American short story writers
20th-century American journalists
20th-century American male writers
21st-century American male writers
Novelists from New Jersey
21st-century American non-fiction writers